Cornelius Michael Power (December 18, 1913 – May 22, 1997) was an American prelate of the Roman Catholic Church. He served as archbishop of the Archdiocese of Portland in Oregon from 1974 to 1986.  He previously served as bishop of the Diocese of Yakima in Washington State from 1969 until 1974.

Biography

Early life 
Cornelius Power was born on December `8, 1913, to Irish immigrants William and Katherine (Kate) (née Dougherty) Power in Seattle, Washington. He had five siblings. After receiving a public education in the Beacon Hill section of Seattle from 1919 to 1923, Power attended St. Mary Parochial School.  Power started in 1927 at O'Dea High School in Seattle.

In 1928, after a year at O'Dea, Power entered St. Joseph College in Mountain View, California. He then went in 1933 to Saint Patrick Seminary in Menlo Park, California.  In 1935, he entered Saint Edward Seminary in Kenmore, Washington, finishing his preparation for the priesthood in 1939.

Priesthood 
Power was ordained to the priesthood for the Diocese of Seattle by Bishop Gerald Shaughnessy on June 3, 1939.  After his ordination, Power served as assistant pastor at St. James Cathedral Parish.  He travelled to Washington D.C. in 1940 to study canon law at the Catholic University of America.  Power returned to Seattle in 1943 to be appointed chaplain of Holy Names Academy in that city.  He was transferred in 1953 to be chaplain of St. James Cathedral.

In 1955, Power left St. James to serve as administrator of Our Lady of the Lake Parish in Seattle, rising to become its pastor in 1956. He remained at Our Lady of the Lake for the next thirteen years, whilst concurrently holding several positions in the archdiocesan curia. Power was promoted to the rank of domestic prelate of his holiness on January 12, 1963.

Bishop of Yakima 
On February 5, 1969, Power was appointed the second bishop of the Diocese of Yakima by Pope Paul VI. He received his episcopal consecration on May 1, 1969, from Archbishop Thomas Connolly, with Bishops Thomas Gill and Joseph Dougherty serving as co-consecrators. Power assumed as his episcopal motto: Servite Domino In Laetitia, meaning, "I will serve God cheerfully."

Archbishop of Portland 
Paul VI appointed Power as Archbishop of the Archdiocese of Portland on January 15, 1974; he was installed on April 17, 1974, in the Cathedral of the Immaculate Conception.

During his tenure in Portland, Power formed a five-year plan for the archdiocese and created an endowment fund. Power founded the Oregon Catholic Conference and held the first clergy and archdiocesan conventions.  He reorganized the local curia, Catholic Charities, and reestablished Catholic Truth Society of Oregon as the Oregon Catholic Press. He also encouraged ministries to Spanish-speaking and Southeast Asian residents.

Retirement and legacy 
Pope Paul II accepted Power's resignation as archbishop of the Archdiocese of Portland on July 1, 1986; he spent his retirement in providing retreats and assistance to parishes.

Cornelius Power died of pneumonia in Portland on May 22, 1997, at age 83. He is buried at Mount Calvary Cemetery.

References

External links
Archdiocese of Portland

1913 births
1997 deaths
People from Seattle
Roman Catholic Archdiocese of Seattle
American Roman Catholic clergy of Irish descent
20th-century Roman Catholic archbishops in the United States
Roman Catholic archbishops of Portland in Oregon
Roman Catholic bishops of Yakima
Catholics from Oregon
Oregon clergy
Catholic University of America alumni
Burials at Mount Calvary Cemetery (Portland, Oregon)